Karam Elahi Qadari aka Hazrat Karam Elahi Hazrat Kanwan Wali Sarkar (Punjabi, Urdu: حضرات کرم الہیٰ سرکار المعروف کانواں والی سرکار ) ( Master of Crows) was Durvaish  of Malaamti Order of Spiritualism  great Sufi of Qadiriyya from * Gujrat, Pakistan Punjab Pakistan. He was Born on 13 April 1838. He was famous by the name of Sain Kanwan wali Sarkar. This name was given to him because many crows sat upon his head and shoulders all the time. He died on 23 Safar as per Islamic calendar and 20 July 1930 in Gujrat, Pakistan.

References

Mughal Empire Sufis
Punjabi people
Qadiri order
Sufi saints
Shrines in Pakistan
Punjabi Sufis